Brett Eddy (born 26 August 1989) is a former professional Australian rules footballer who played for the Port Adelaide Football Club in the Australian Football League (AFL).

Victorian Football League

Collingwood 
Eddy was previously listed with Collingwood's VFL team in 2011, he kicked 21 goals in eight games before injuring his ACL.

South Australian National Football League

South Adelaide 
He joined South Adelaide in 2013, playing for four seasons and having an impressive 2016 season kicking 74 goals and winning the Ken Farmer Medal. He was runner up for the medal in 2014 and 2015.

Australian Football League

Port Adelaide 
Eddy was drafted by Port Adelaide as a mature aged rookie with their 2nd pick, 26th overall, in the 2017 rookie draft.

He kicked five goals in a JLT Community Series match against Hawthorn at Hickinbotham Oval (South Adelaide's home ground, his former club).

He made his AFL debut in Round 1 against Sydney at the SCG. He was delisted by Port Adelaide at the conclusion of the 2017 season.

References

External links

SANFL playing statistics

Living people
1989 births
Australian rules footballers from Victoria (Australia)
Port Adelaide Football Club players
Port Adelaide Football Club players (all competitions)
South Adelaide Football Club players
Sandringham Football Club players
Wanderers Football Club players
Port Adelaide Football Club (SANFL) players